Yellur is a village in Udupi District in the state of Karnataka in India.

Yellur and its surrounding places were acquired to set up a coal-based thermal power station, the Udupi Power Plant.

Set in Kudremukh National Park, Yellur contains lush green vegetation, forests, and fertile crop fields. The village houses Mahathobhara Shri Vishveshara Temple which is said to be there from eleventh century.

External links 
 About power plant being set up by Nagarjuna
 Vishveshvara Temple

Villages in Udupi district